Saint Godard may refer to:

Saint Gildard (c. 448 – c. 525), Bishop of Rouen
Gotthard of Hildesheim (960–1038), German bishop